Mark Travis Little (born July 11, 1972, in Edwardsville, Illinois) is a former outfielder in Major League Baseball. Little retired after the  season, after playing for the Florida Marlins Triple-A affiliate, the Albuquerque Isotopes. He batted and threw right-handed.

After playing for the University of Memphis in college, Little was drafted by the Texas Rangers in the 8th round of the  amateur draft. Little played four years in the Rangers minor league system, getting as high as Triple-A, before being traded on August 9, along with Darren Oliver and Fernando Tatís to the St. Louis Cardinals for Royce Clayton and Todd Stottlemyre. Little was assigned to the Cardinals Triple-A affiliate, the Memphis Redbirds, before making his major league debut on September 12, .  In 2000, he led the Triple-A Memphis Redbirds with 22 stolen bases.

A free agent after the  season, Little signed with the Colorado Rockies on November 7, 2000.  saw Little get the most at bats in a single season of his entire career with 130; he did this playing for the Rockies, New York Mets, and Arizona Diamondbacks. He was acquired by the Mets along with John Thomson for Jay Payton, Mark Corey, and Robert Stratton. He was then dealt by the Mets to the Diamondbacks for P.J. Bevis. Little was released by the Diamondbacks on May 30, and signed with the Cleveland Indians on June 3, 2003. He won the Governors' Cup with the Buffalo Bisons, the AAA affiliate of the Indians, in 2004. Released by Cleveland following the 2004 season, Little signed a minor league contract with the Florida Marlins on November 4, 2004.

References

External links

1972 births
Living people
Major League Baseball outfielders
Baseball players from Illinois
St. Louis Cardinals players
Colorado Rockies players
New York Mets players
Arizona Diamondbacks players
Cleveland Indians players
Hudson Valley Renegades players
Charlotte Rangers players
Tulsa Drillers players
Oklahoma City 89ers players
Memphis Redbirds players
Oklahoma RedHawks players
Colorado Springs Sky Sox players
Norfolk Tides players
Tucson Sidewinders players
Buffalo Bisons (minor league) players
Gulf Coast Marlins players
Albuquerque Isotopes players
Memphis Tigers baseball players
Sportspeople from Greater St. Louis
People from Edwardsville, Illinois
All-American college baseball players
Lake Land Lakers baseball players